Love Without Illusions (German: Liebe ohne Illusion) is a 1955 West German drama film directed by Erich Engel and starring Sonja Ziemann, Curd Jürgens and Heidemarie Hatheyer.

It was shot at the Spandau Studios in Berlin with location shooting around the city including at Tempelhof Airport. The film's sets were designed by the art director Rolf Zehetbauer.

Synopsis
While her husband is held as a prisoner of war, a woman has become a doctor. When he is finally released he is unable to resume his former career, putting a strain on their marriage.

Cast
 Sonja Ziemann as Ursula 
 Curd Jürgens as Walter 
 Heidemarie Hatheyer as Christa 
 Ernst Schröder as Jellinek 
 Leonard Steckel as Professor Dürkheim 
 Maria Sebaldt as Nelli 
 Gert Günther Hoffmann as Fritz 
 Hans Emons 
 Karin Evans 
 Lou Seitz 
 Edelweiß Malchin 
 Erich Fiedler as Modeschau-Conferancier 
 Heinz Giese 
 Gert Kollat

References

Bibliography
 Hake, Sabine. German National Cinema. Routledge, 2013.

External links 
 

1955 films
1955 drama films
German drama films
West German films
1950s German-language films
Films directed by Erich Engel
Constantin Film films
Films shot at Spandau Studios
Films shot in Berlin
German black-and-white films
1950s German films